is the ninth single released by Mr. Children on August 10, 1995. This music video is the parody of Elvis Costello song "Pump It Up". The single debuted at the number-one position on the Japanese Oricon weekly single charts.

Along with their previous single "Es (Theme of Es)," "See-Saw Game (Yūkan na Koi no Uta)" was certified as a million-selling single of 1995 by the Recording Industry Association of Japan. It's the best selling Non tie-up single in Japan.

Track listing

References

1995 singles
Oricon Weekly number-one singles
Mr. Children songs
Songs written by Kazutoshi Sakurai
1995 songs
Toy's Factory singles